Altaf Mahmud (1967–1971) was a Bangladeshi music director. He composed for 19 films in his career before his death in the 1971 Independence War.  The following is a list of films he scored:

1960s

1970s

Non-film songs

As lyricist

References

Discographies of Bangladeshi artists